The men's 4 x 400 metres relay event at the 2003 European Athletics U23 Championships was held in Bydgoszcz, Poland, at Zawisza Stadion on 20 July.

Medalists

Results

Final
20 July

Participation
According to an unofficial count, 32 athletes from 8 countries participated in the event.

 (4)
 (4)
 (4)
 (4)
 (4)
 (4)
 (4)
 (4)

References

4 x 400 metres relay
Relays at the European Athletics U23 Championships